Clarence Stasavich (February 9, 1913 – October 24, 1975) was an American football player, coach, and college athletics administrator.  He served as the head football coach at Lenoir–Rhyne University in Hickory, North Carolina from 1946 to 1961 and at East Carolina College—renamed East Carolina University in 1967—from 1963 to 1969, compiling a career college football of 171–64–7.  He led Lenoir–Rhyne to the NAIA Football National Championship in 1960.  Stasavich was also the athletic director at East Carolina from 1963 to 1975.

Playing career
Stasavich attended Lenoir–Rhyne College–now known as—Lenoir–Rhyne University in Hickory, North Carolina, where he played football for four years as an end. He also played basketball at Lenoir–Rhyne for four years, tennis for two, and baseball for one. In 1941, Stasavich played professional football for the Charlotte Clippers of the Dixie League.

Coaching career

East Carolina
Stasavich was the head football coach at East Carolina from 1962 to 1969 and the athletic director from 1963 to 1975.  During those eight years Stasavich posted a 50–27–1 record.  In 1963 East Carolina was 9–1 and record the program's first bowl game victory, against North Eastern in the Eastern Bowl.  In 1964, Stasavich's team again posted a 9–1 record and beat UMass in the Tangerine Bowl, 14–13.  The 1965 football season was a repeat of 1964's record and bowl appearance, expect the Pirates won against Maine, 31–0, in the Tangerine Bowl.  Also in 1965, Stasavich helped bring East Carolina into the Southern Conference.  In 1969, Stasavich was the third-winningest active coach after Bear Bryant of Alabama and Johnny Vaught of Ole Miss.

Death, awards, and honors
Stasavich died of a heart attack, on October 24, 1975, at Pitt County Memorial Hospital in Greenville, North Carolina.

Stasavich's love for the Southern Conference was honored when the conference named the football championship trophy the Clarence Stasavich Memorial Trophy.  Stasavich was inducted into the North Carolina Sports Hall of Fame in 1970, the ECU Hall of Fame in 1976, the National Association of Directors of Athletics Hall of Fame in 1977, and the Florida Citrus Bowl Hall of Fame in 1986. Lenoir-Rhyne and the city of Hickory, North Carolina named one of the campus streets Stasavich Place in honor of his accomplishments. The street runs in front of the gymnasium and is the main entry to Helen and Leonard Moretz Stadium, the university's football facility.

Head coaching record

References

External links
 East Carolina Hall of Fame profile
 East Carolina University Icons Gallery profile
 Clarence Stasavich Papers. UA 90-07. University Archives, East Carolina University

1913 births
1975 deaths
American football ends
East Carolina Pirates athletic directors
East Carolina Pirates football coaches
Lenoir–Rhyne Bears football coaches
Lenoir–Rhyne Bears baseball players
Lenoir–Rhyne Bears football players
Lenoir–Rhyne Bears men's basketball players
College men's tennis players in the United States
University of North Carolina at Chapel Hill alumni
United States Navy personnel of World War II
United States Navy officers